Forson may refer to:

Anthony Forson, Ghanaian politician, lawyer and diplomat
Cassiel Ato Forson, Ghanaian politician and deputy minister for Finance
Habiba Atta Forson, Ghanaian football administrator and former athlete
Kaya Forson (born 2002), Ghanaian swimmer
Keenan Forson (born 2001), English professional footballer
Lydia Forson (born 1984), Ghanaian actress, writer, and producer
Psyche Williams-Forson, American scholar and writer
Richmond Forson (born 1980), former professional footballer
Sammy Forson (born 1984), Ghanaian-Zambian media personality
Tommy Annan Forson, veteran Ghanaian Broadcaster

See also
Forson Amankwah (born 2002), Ghanaian professional footballer